USS Carolinian (ID-1445) was a cargo ship that served in the United States Navy from 1918 to 1919.

Carolinian was built as a commercial cargo ship in 1906 at West Hartlepool, England, by the Furness-Withy Company. She operated under the names SS Harley and SS Southerner.  By the time the United States entered World War I in 1917, she was named SS Carolinian and was the property of the Garland Steamship Company of New York City. For most of the war, she operated under a United States Army charter.  The U.S. Navy acquired her for World War I service on 5 October 1918, assigned her the naval registry Identification Number (Id. No.) 1445, and commissioned her the same day as USS Carolinian.

Carolinian operated in European waters, based at Cardiff, Wales, carrying coal from Cardiff and other English ports to France for use by U.S. Army transports coaling at French ports from her commissioning until 8 February 1919.

On 8 February 1919, Carolinian departed for Newport News, Virginia, with a U.S. Army cargo, and, after stopping in the Azores for voyage repairs, arrived at Baltimore, Maryland, on 12 March 1919 to discharge her cargo and start inactivation.

Carolinian was decommissioned on 22 March 1919 and transferred to the United States Shipping Board the same day for return to the Garland Steamship Company.

References

Department of the Navy: Naval Historical Center Online Library of Selected Images:  Civilian Ships: S.S. Carolinian (American Freighter, 1906). Previously named Harley and Southerner. Served as USS Carolinian (ID # 1445) in 1918-1919
NavSource Online: Section Patrol Craft Photo Archive: Carolinian (ID 1445)

World War I cargo ships of the United States
Ships built on the River Tees
1906 ships
Cargo ships of the United States Navy